Dembo Sylla (born 10 November 2002) is a French professional footballer who plays as a right-back for Laval.

Career
A youth product of Laval since the U9s, Sylla began his career with their reserves in 2019 before signing his first professional contract with the club on 8 August 2022. He made his senior and professional debut with Laval as a late substitute in a 1–0 loss to Nîmes Olympique on 27 August 2022.

Personal life
Born in France, Sylla is of Guinean descent. His sister Sounkamba Sylla is a French professional athlete.

References

External links
 
 Ligue 2 profile

2002 births
Living people
People from Laval, Mayenne
French footballers
French sportspeople of Guinean descent
Stade Lavallois players
Ligue 2 players
Championnat National 3 players
Association football fullbacks